En Kaadhali Scene Podura is a 2019 Indian Tamil-language romantic comedy film directed by Ram Sevaa. It stars Mahesh and Shalu Chourasiya alongside an ensemble cast. Featuring music composed by Amresh Ganesh, the film began production in mid-2018 was released on 13 September 2019.

Cast
Mahesh as Karthi
Shalu Chourasiya
Aadukalam Naren
Manobala
Ambani Shankar
Gokulnath
Diya
Thennavan
Vaiyapuri
Sandy in a special appearance

Production
The film featuring Mahesh and debutant Shalu Chourasiya was shot in early 2018, with director Ram Sevaa making his second film after the unreleased Tea Kadai Bench. The director based the story of the film on a real life incident that he had witnessed in the 1990s, and completed the shoot of the film within 23 days. The film's music is composed by Amresh Ganesh, and prior to release, Mahesh highlighted it as a major selling point of the film.

Soundtrack
The film's soundtrack was composed by Amresh Ganesh.
"Bro Bro" - Amresh Ganesh
"Chella Nilavey" - Sharath Santhosh
"Nilla Kallula" - Senthil Ganesh, Rajalakshmi
"Scene Podura" - Krish

Release
In its review, The Indian Express gave a negative impression and wrote the film was "a mess of a movie that does not know what it wants to be". Maalaimalar praised the music while criticizing the cinematography.

References

External links

2019 films
2010s Tamil-language films
2019 romantic comedy films
Indian romantic comedy films